Christopher Adrian Craft (17 November 1939 – 20 February 2021) was a British racing driver who competed in many different forms of motor sport.

Biography
Craft was born in Porthleven, Cornwall and began his career in 1962, with a Ford Anglia and became recognised as a leading saloon car racer, particularly with the Team Broadspeed Escort which he campaigned from 1968 to 1970. Having also previously driven a Tecno in Formula Three, he moved to sports cars from 1968, initially with a Chevron and then joined forces with Alain de Cadenet to drive his Porsche 908 and McLaren M8C. It was this association that led to his participation in two World Championship Formula One Grands Prix, in 1971, driving a Brabham BT33 prepared by Cadenet's team Ecurie Evergreen, but he failed to score a championship point. He did not qualify for his first World Championship race (the 1971 Canadian Grand Prix at Mosport Park) but would have been able to start the race following the withdrawal of two other drivers due to accidents in the raceday warm-up sessions. However, his own car suffered engine trouble, denying him the opportunity. His second Grand Prix, at Watkins Glen ended with a suspension failure and tyre problems during the race.

Craft continued to compete in many other forms of motor racing, including saloon cars, notably with a Ford Capri; sports cars, including a period with the Dome team in the early 1980s; Formula 3 and Formula 5000. Craft won the 1973 European Sportscar Championship in a Lola T92.  One of the highlights of his career was a third-place finish in the 1976 24 Hours of Le Mans.

After his race career Chris Craft started the Light Car Company with F1 designer Gordon Murray to build the Light Car Company Rocket.

Racing record

Complete British Saloon Car Championship results
(key) (Races in bold indicate pole position; races in italics indicate fastest lap.)

† Events with 2 races staged for the different classes.

Complete Formula One results
(key)

References

External links

 Profile at www.grandprix.com

1939 births
2021 deaths
English racing drivers
English Formula One drivers
British Touring Car Championship drivers
People from Porthleven
Sportspeople from Cornwall
24 Hours of Le Mans drivers
World Sportscar Championship drivers